Taps is a 1981 American drama film starring George C. Scott and Timothy Hutton, with Ronny Cox, Tom Cruise, Sean Penn, and Evan Handler in supporting roles.  Hutton was nominated for a Golden Globe award in 1982. The film was directed by Harold Becker from a screenplay by Robert Mark Kamen, James Lineberger, and Darryl Ponicsan, based on Devery Freeman's 1979 novel Father Sky. The original music score was composed by Maurice Jarre. It was filmed at Valley Forge Military Academy and College.

The film follows a group of military school students who decide to take over their school to save it from closing. It was Penn's first film role, and Cruise's second and his first major role following a brief appearance in Endless Love a few months earlier.

Plot
Cadet Brian Moreland meets privately with Bunker Hill Military Academy commander General Harlan Bache, who promotes him to Cadet Major, the highest cadet rank. The next day Bache announces that the school's board of trustees will sell the school to real estate developers but that they will remain open for one more year to allow the seniors to graduate and the underclassmen to find other schools. Bache and the cadets hope this will be a chance to save the school.

A dance is held at the academy after commencement. Local teenagers outside the gates harass some cadets and a brawl breaks out. When Bache attempts to end the fight, his service pistol is seized by one of the local boys and the weapon discharges, killing one of the local boys. Although the magazine was removed, a round was still in the chamber. Bache is held responsible and after he is arrested has a heart attack which leaves him in critical condition at the hospital. The board decides to close the school immediately.

Moreland meets with his officers and they unanimously decide to take control of the campus.  When the Dean of Students arrives with the local Sheriff to empty the armory they find that the weapons are already gone. They are confronted by an armed cadre of cadets led by Major Moreland, who demand to meet with Bache and negotiate with the board of trustees to keep the school open. The Dean and Sheriff are escorted off the academy and armed cadets secure the perimeter.

Meanwhile another group of cadets have been sent to a local food supply warehouse to restock their provisions but one of their trucks breaks down on the way back. As Cadet Captain Dwyer attempts to fix the engine a group of local boys threaten them and surround the truck until hotheaded Cadet Captain David Shawn opens fire with his M16, shooting several bursts into the air. The locals scatter and the cadets abandon the stalled truck, fleeing the scene in the other truck and ramming a sheriff's car in the escape.

The police surround the campus and a delegation of parents led by Moreland's father arrives but does not change the cadets' minds. To demonstrate to the police and parents that none of the boys are being held against their will, Moreland assembles the cadets and offers them a chance to walk out. All of them choose to stay. The siege grows more tense when the National Guard arrives, bringing numerous infantry, armored personnel carriers, and tanks. Colonel Kerby, their commander, is more respectful and sympathetic toward the cadets, but negotiations still fail to go anywhere.

At the next morning muster the officers report that some cadets have fled the campus.  Moreland assembles the entire battalion and again offers cadets the opportunity to leave. Led by Moreland’s friend, Lieutenant Edward West, at least half of the remaining cadets drop their weapons and leave. After the electricity and water are turned off, one of the cadets is severely burned as they attempt to restart the school's old gasoline powered generator. They permit an ambulance to enter and take the injured boy to a hospital and, afterwards, Moreland offers to stand down if the order comes from General Bache. Kerby replies that Bache had died the previous night. The cadets, deeply hurt by Bache's death, hold a military memorial service in his honor, of which even the Guardsmen salute.

The next night an M48 Patton tank rolls up to the main gate. One of the younger cadets, on sentry duty, panics and runs out to surrender. He drops his weapon which fires upon hitting the ground.  The National Guard return fire and kill another cadet.

The boy's death weakens Moreland’s resolve considerably and he decides to end the occupation.  He calls all the cadets to muster and orders them to surrender. But the rebellious David Shawn starts shooting and the campus is overrun by the authorities as a firefight ensues.  Moreland runs to Shawn's room to stop him, but both young men are killed by suppressing fire and the siege ends abruptly. A montage of scenes from the Academy's proud past flash across the screen in the aftermath.

Cast

 George C. Scott as Brigadier General Harlan Bache
 Timothy Hutton as Cadet Major Brian Moreland
 Ronny Cox as Colonel Kerby
 Sean Penn as Cadet Captain Alex Dwyer (in his debut film role)
 Tom Cruise as Cadet Captain David Shawn
 Brendan Ward as Cadet Plebe Charlie Auden
 Evan Handler as Cadet First Lieutenant Edward West
 John P. Navin, Jr. as Cadet Plebe Derek Mellot
 Billy Van Zandt as Cadet Bug
 Giancarlo Esposito as Cadet Captain J.C. Pierce
 Earl Hindman as Lieutenant Hanson
 Jeff Rochlin as Cadet Shovel
 Jess Osuna as Dean Ferris

Reception
Film review aggregator Rotten Tomatoes reported that 68% of the 25 sampled critics gave the film a positive review and that it got an average score of 6.2/10. Film critic Roger Ebert gave the film 3 stars (out of four), comparing the film to the classic novel Lord of the Flies (1954).

The film earned North American rentals of $20.5 million.

Home media
The film was released on DVD on March 5, 2002 and also was released on Blu-ray on May 3, 2011.

See also

 List of American films of 1981

References

External links

 
 

1981 films
1981 drama films
American drama films
1980s English-language films
Films based on American novels
Films directed by Harold Becker
20th Century Fox films
Films shot in Pennsylvania
Films scored by Maurice Jarre
Films with screenplays by Robert Mark Kamen
1980s American films